Stepankov is a Russian masculine surname, its feminine counterpart is Stepankova. It may refer to
Konstantin Stepankov (1928–2004), Soviet actor
Lucie Štěpánková (born 1981), is Czech actress
Valentin Stepankov (born 1951), Russian prosecutor general 

Russian-language surnames